Guatemala–Venezuelan relations are the bilateral relations between Guatemala and Venezuela.

History 

In 2020, during the Venezuelan presidential crisis, Guatemalan President Alejandro Giammattei announced it would sever ties with Venezuela, prompting to close its embassy both in Caracas and Guatemala City.
So Alejandro Giammattei recognized Juan Guaido as Venezuela’s legit president.

See also 

 Foreign relations of Guatemala
 Foreign relations of Venezuela

References 

Venezuela
Guatemala